Anita Allen may refer to:

 Anita Allen (judge) (born 1947), Bahamian judge
 Anita Allen (pentathlete) (born 1977), American officer and pentathlete
 Anita L. Allen (born 1953), American scholar

See also
 Allen (surname)